Ram Krishna Bantawa is a Nepalese writer.

Works 
Shrill Mist   is his first novel from outside Nepal and his first novel in English. The Nepali edition of Shrill Mist (Shaghan Tuwalo), assisted by translator Nara Devi Rai, preceded the English translation. Published in Kathmandu in 2007, it achieved popular and critical acclaim. Bantawa published his first novel, Kharani (Ashes), in 1988, when he was twenty-one. Atma (Soul) followed in 1996, Radha Ram in 1997 and Ama Chhori (Mother and Daughter) in 1998. Bhag Ek (Part 1), a book of modern songs, appeared in 1995, followed by Bhag Dui (Part 2) in 1998. His first album, Dhuwa (Smoke), performed by various Nepali singers and musicians, was produced in 1998.

Bantawa's drama Asiskha pratiphal (Disadvantages of the Ignorant) was published in 1995.

In 1999 his short epic, Mayazal (Web of Love) a poetry collection, Mirmire (Dawn) came out.

In 2005, Bantawa's folk, contemporary and pop album Aava (Sparks), sung solo by the Nepali singer Abha Mukarung, brought stardom to the singer in Nepal. Awaz (Voice), an album dedicated to peace, featured Bantawa's lyrics with music written by Nepali/Hindi singer-composer Nagandra Shrest and sung by Nagandra Shrest, Bikal Pardhan and Abha Mukarung, followed in 2006.

In 2010 he published Ghar Timro sapanako (Anthology of songs).

Recognition 
In 1998 Bantawa was awarded an honorary membership in the Art Academy of Nepal for Asiskha Pratiphal.

In 2005 Nepal's Shabda Satabdi (Word of the Century) Association gave him its Creative Award.

In 2006 the Indigenous Association of Nepal presented him its Best Indigenous Song Writer Talent Award.

In 2007 he was honored by two Hong Kong Nepalese organizations, the Khotang Society and the British Gurkha Ex-Servicemen's Association.

In 2008 he was honored by Hong Kong Nepalese Federation.

In 2009 he became an Honorary Member, Eastern Mirror Society Nepal, an Honorary Member, Rawa-Sawa Academic Society Nepal and was honored by Kirant Rai Association Hong Kong Nepal.

In 2010 he was honored by Nepalese Literary Academy Hong Kong Nepal and the Heavenly path Society, Hong Kong Nepal. He became an honorary Member, Khotang Society Hong Kong Nepal and the Achchha Rai Rasik Literary Academy Nepal.

Reviews of Shrill Mist 
"Shrill Mist is a novel quite different from anything I have ever read, a superb novel, a breakthrough in Nepal fiction. It re-energizes our culture even as it criticizes it. The characters leave an indelible impression on the mind. I was spellbound...." Dr. Bishnu Rai

"Ram Krishna Bantawa's Shrill Mist is a radical novel in which a militant female spirit struggles against the overpowering cultural geography of Nepal, both and magical. This is fiction that is new in every aspect." Dr. Tulasi Bhattarai

"A marvelous novel! I want to be Mother! Like art that has found a new frequency on which to reach us, there is beautiful rebellion here. But there is also a profound message told against the majestic landscape of Nepal: injustice is a sin!" Momila Joshi

"This is new craftsmanship, a remarkable contribution from a writer of our diaspora. Shrill Mist breaks the chain of our literary tradition, exposing the evil, irrational senseless inhumanity of Nepali consciousness from within an experimentally fractured, existentialist, even romantic story that ends as mysteriously as does all history that has yet to complete its journey." Purna Infada

References

External links
 Shrill Mist by Ram Krishna Bantawa.
 RTHK Ram Krishna Bantawa.

Living people
1960s births
Hong Kong songwriters
Hong Kong lyricists
Hong Kong dramatists and playwrights
Hong Kong novelists
20th-century novelists
21st-century novelists
